American singer-songwriter Anita Baker has released six studio albums, one compilation & live album, and twenty-four singles. Referred as the "Queen of Romantic Quiet-Storm R&B/Soul", she is considered to be one of the most successful and influential R&B artists of the 1980s. According to Recording Industry Association of America, Baker has sold 13 million certified albums in the United States, including three multi-platinum albums. She has also scored 5 number-one hits on Billboards Adult R&B Airplay and 13 top ten hits on Billboards Hot R&B/Hip-Hop Songs.

Baker's debut album The Songstress peaked at number twelve on Billboards Top R&B Albums and has sold nearly half a million copies worldwide. Rapture (1986) remains the best-selling album of her career, with sales of over 8 million copies worldwide. It peaked at number 11 on Billboard 200 and is certified 5× Platinum in the United States. Giving You the Best That I Got (1988) became Bakers first and only album to reach number one on Billboard 200. It also produced the highest-peaking single of her career on the Billboard Hot 100, which notably peaked at number three. To date, the album has sold over 5 million copies worldwide. In 1990, Baker released her fourth studio-album Compositions. It peaked at number five on the Billboard 200 and number seven on the UK Albums Chart. It reportedly sold a million copies in its first week alone and eventually became her third consecutive platinum-selling album in the US. As of 1995, Baker's catalog has sold 17 million albums worldwide.

Ten years after her prior studio record, Baker made her comeback with her sixth studio album My Everything. It debuted at number four on US Billboard 200, selling 132,000 copies in its first week and was eventually certified gold by the RIAA.

Albums

Studio albums

 The Songstress was re-released by Elektra Records on November 12, 1991, and peaked at number 90 on the Hot R&B Albums chart.

Live albums

Compilation albums

Singles

Other appearances

References

Discographies of American artists
Rhythm and blues discographies
Soul music discographies